Thomas Enqvist defeated Lleyton Hewitt 4–6, 6–1, 6–2 to secure the title.

Seeds

  Patrick Rafter (second round)
  Thomas Enqvist (champion)
  Gustavo Kuerten (second round)
  Jason Stoltenberg (semifinals)
  Byron Black (quarterfinals)
  Michael Chang (second round)
  Nicolas Kiefer (first round)
  Mariano Puerta (first round)

Draw

Finals

Section 1

Section 2

External links
1999 Next Generation Adelaide International Draw

Singles